A replacement banknote, commonly referred to as a star note, is a banknote that is printed to replace a faulty one and is used as a control mechanism for governments or monetary authorities to know the exact number of banknotes being printed. Also, since no two serial numbers can be the same, the bill is simply reprinted with a symbol in the serial number, identifying it as a replacement for an error note. Replacement bills have different symbols to mark the error around the world, although the most popular examples are "star notes".

Description
As quality control finds defective notes in the printing process after the serial number has been overprinted, they are taken out with their serial number written down and replaced with another banknote printed specifically for this purpose, so that the number of banknotes being printed stays the same in each production batch. This saves time and money compared to re-printing exactly the same serial number that was used before. It is rare that the replacement banknote has the same serial number as the original faulty one. A replacement note will have its own serial-numbering system that separates it from the normal numbering system.

Examples of marker by countries
 The United States, India and the Philippines use the "★" in the serial number to mark a replacement banknote. These are known as "star notes". These were also used by Australia until 1972.
 Canada used "✽" at the beginning of serial numbers on its replacement banknotes until 1975. They are known as "asterisk notes". Some later issues use prefixes with "33" or "X" to mark replacement banknotes.
 Argentina uses "R" in the serial number to mark replacement banknotes.
 The Bahamas, Sri Lanka, Malaysia and Guatemala use "Z" in the serial number to mark replacement banknotes. 
 Scotland, Hong Kong and Mongolia use "ZZ" in the serial number to mark replacement banknotes.
 Singapore uses "Z/0" in the serial number to mark replacement banknotes.
 Indonesia uses "X" in the serial number to mark replacement banknotes.
 Iraq uses prefix "Letter/99" in the serial number to mark replacement banknotes.
 Zambia uses "X3" in the serial number to mark replacement polymer banknotes.
 Thailand uses "5 OS" in the serial number to mark replacement polymer banknotes.
 Serbia uses "ZA" in the serial number to mark replacement banknotes.
 Nigeria uses "DZ" in the serial number to mark replacement banknotes.

Different countries may also have their own numbering or marking schemes. There is no guaranteed way to know the rarity of replacement banknotes as they are only introduced to replace defective ones. Some banknote collectors go after these rather unusual banknotes as their specialty. Both paper and polymer replacement notes exist as this control mechanism.

Star note
A star note is also a bank note that has an asterisk (*), or star, after the serial number. Many early issues carried the star in front of the serial number.  These have been used by various countries around the world including Australia and the United States. In the US, the Bureau of Engraving and Printing inspects currency for printing errors prior to releasing notes into general circulation. When notes are discovered that have been printed incorrectly (such as having the serial numbers upside down, etc.) the misprinted "error notes" are replaced with star notes because no two bills within a certain series can be produced with the same serial number. They are used to maintain a correct count of notes in a serial number run. By their nature, star notes are more scarce than notes with standard serial numbers and as such are widely collected by notaphilists. Some of the highest prices paid for modern (post-1928) U.S. banknotes have been for star notes.

A star note was also substituted for the last note in a block rather than printing a note with a serial number consisting of eight zeros. This practice is no longer in use, as the highest range of serial numbers is now reserved for uncut sheets sold to collectors, so regular notes intended for circulation do not reach the final serial number in the block.

Pre-star replacement note
Before the asterisk (*), or star, was introduced in the United States in 1910, there was no identifier that distinguished notes that had been replaced due to printing errors, and thus these replacements went largely unnoticed. Beginning in 1903, the advent of the rotary press improved production by applying all eight serial numbers in a single pass, unlike the prior paging machine, which applied one number at a time.  While the rotary press improved production, it was counterproductive to use to print a single replacement sheet, thus the older paging machines were retained and used to make replacements.  Due to the distinctive font differences between these two processes, replacement notes, pre-star, can be identified based on several factors including year of printing and close examination of the printed serial number font.

References

Banknotes
Numismatic terminology